Carabus piochardi is a species of ground beetle from family Carabidae. They are black coloured, and are very similar to Carabus punctatus.

References

piochardi
Beetles described in 1883